Dr. Dude and His Excellent Ray is a pinball machine designed by Dennis Nordman and released in 1990 by Midway (under the Bally label). The theme of the game revolves around gaining coolness.

Gameplay
The ultimate goal of the game is to become a cool Super Dude by visiting the kinetic clinic with the excellent ray as a treatment. To achieve this, the player has at first to collect the ingredients of ultimate hipness to increase the Dude-O-Meter: the Heart of Rock 'n' Roll, a Magnetic Personality, and the Gift of gab.

Further gameplay features include the Excellent Ray to start multiball, Big Shot - a bully figure that insults the player, the Molecular Mixmaster - a spinning disc with a rubber post on it, surrounded by targets and a Gazillion point shot with scoring that potentially can reach multiple millions of points.

Description
Dr. Dude and His Excellent Ray has a colorful cartoon theme and features many playfield toys. The game has 1980's style music, a hidden playfield magnet and an alpha-numeric display. The game was one of the last machines in pinball mainstream with such a display made before switching to the newer dot-matrix score displays. The backbox of the machine includes a lenticular flip image of Ben A. Glich before and after coolness treatment.

Digital versions
Dr. Dude and His Excellent Ray was available as a licensed table of The Pinball Arcade for several platforms prior to the loss of the WMS license in 2018.  After the license passed to Zen Studios, the company announced in 2020 that the table will be part of a forthcoming sixth wave of tables being added to its own curation of Williams pinball tables, available as downloadable content for Pinball FX 3.

References

External links
 

1990 pinball machines
Bally pinball machines